Elin Såger (1614–1669) was a Finnish businessperson.

Biography
Såger was born in Turku where her father, Johan Såger (died in 1632) was a successful merchant. In 1631, she married merchant  who operated ironworks. He founded Ruukki at Fiskars in 1649.

Såger owned and managed a major trading company in Turku and three ironworks after the death of her spouse in 1659. She has been referred to as one of the most financially influential businesswomen in Finnish history.

References

1614 births
1669 deaths
17th-century Swedish businesspeople
17th-century ironmasters
17th-century Finnish women
Finnish businesspeople
Finnish women in business
People from Turku